The 2012 Swiss Open Grand Prix Gold in badminton was the second grand prix gold and grand prix tournament of the 2012 BWF Grand Prix Gold and Grand Prix. The tournament was held in St. Jakobshalle, Basel, Switzerland from March 13 until March 18, 2012 and had a total purse of $125,000.

Men's singles

Seeds

  Lee Chong Wei (withdrew)
  Chen Long (semi-final)
  Peter Gade (second round)
  Chen Jin (champion)
  Lee Hyun-Il (final)
  Kenichi Tago (withdrew)
  Nguyen Tien Minh (third round)
  Du Pengyu (third round)
  Simon Santoso (withdrew)
  Taufik Hidayat (semi-final)
  Jan Ø. Jørgensen (third round)
  Marc Zwiebler (withdrew)
  Shon Wan-Ho (quarter-final)
  Hans-Kristian Vittinghus (quarter-final)
  Tommy Sugiarto (second round)
  Boonsak Ponsana (second round)

Finals

Top half

Section 1

Section 2

Section 3

Section 4

Bottom half

Section 5

Section 6

Section 7

Section 8

Women's singles

Seeds

  Wang Yihan (second round)
  Wang Shixian (final)
  Saina Nehwal (champion)
  Jiang Yanjiao (second round)
  Juliane Schenk (quarter-final)
  Liu Xin (quarter-final)
  Cheng Shao-Chieh (second round)
  Ratchanok Inthanon (semi-final)

Finals

Top half

Section 1

Section 2

Bottom half

Section 3

Section 4

Men's doubles

Seeds

  Chai Biao / Guo Zhendong (second round)
  Mohammad Ahsan / Bona Septano (withdrew)
  Hirokatsu Hashimoto / Noriyasu Hirata (quarter-final)
  Markis Kido / Hendra Setiawan (second round)
  Alvent Yulianto / Hendra Aprida Gunawan (semi-final)
  Naoki Kawamae / Shoji Sato (champion)
  Fang Chieh-Min / Lee Sheng-Mu (final)
  Hiroyuki Endo / Kenichi Hayakawa (semi-final)

Finals

Top half

Section 1

Section 2

Bottom half

Section 3

Section 4

Women's doubles

Seeds

  Ha Jung-Eun / Kim Min-Jung (semi-final)
  Mizuki Fujii / Reika Kakiiwa (quarter-final)
  Shizuka Matsuo / Mami Naito (quarter-final)
  Miyuki Maeda / Satoko Suetsuna (first round)
  Christinna Pedersen / Kamilla Rytter Juhl (quarter-final)
  Bao Yixin / Zhong Qianxin (final)
  Cheng Wen-Hsing / Chien Yu-Chin (quarter-final)
  Meiliana Jauhari / Greysia Polii (second round)

Finals

Top half

Section 1

Section 2

Bottom half

Section 3

Section 4

Mixed doubles

Seeds

  Tontowi Ahmad / Lilyana Natsir (champion)
  Chen Hung-Ling / Cheng Wen-Hsing (quarter-final)
  Sudket Prapakamol / Saralee Thoungthongkam (final)
  Thomas Laybourn / Kamilla Rytter Juhl (withdrew)
  Chan Peng Soon / Goh Liu Ying (quarter-final)
  Songphon Anugritayawon / Kunchala Voravichitchaikul (second round)
  Michael Fuchs / Birgit Michels (first round)
  Valiyaveetil Diju / Jwala Gutta (first round)

Finals

Top half

Section 1

Section 2

Bottom half

Section 3

Section 4

References

Swiss Open (badminton)
Swiss Open Grand Prix Gold
Swiss Open Grand Prix Gold
Sports competitions in Basel
BWF Grand Prix Gold and Grand Prix